Korosh Ghazimorad (born 1969) is a Persian graphic designer, calligrapher and artist.

He is a graduate of wood and paper industry, and Iran’s Calligraphers’ Association.His artworks have been exhibited in Iran, US, Belgium, France, and Lebanon. The last Exhibition of Ghazimorad named “Science of Nescience” was hold at Sohrab Gallery in 2019.

Professional career 
Ghazimorad was accepted in the Iran Calligraphers’ Association in 1989, and he successfully passed Supreme Degree in Shekasteh Nastaʿlīq. He was graduated from university in 1996, and was employed at Hozeh Honari for his military service and worked in different departments including visual arts, Besat studio, etc. He gained his first serious experience in the field of graphics during this time. Korosh worked with artists Hossein Khosrojerdi, Hamid Sharifi, Ahmad Gholizadeh, Morteza Godarzi, and Iraj Eskandari during this period.

Ghazimorad had also been a board member of the Iran Graphic Designers’ Society.

Personal life 
Ghazimorad was born on 16 September 1969 in Tehran. Ghazimorad is the oldest child of the family and has a sister and a brother.

He got married in 2002 and has a son.

Exhibitions

Solo exhibitions

Group exhibitions

References

1969 births
Living people
Iranian graphic designers
Iranian calligraphers